Mirko Vičević (30 June 1968) is a Montenegrin retired water polo player. He achieved 1057 goals in his career. He is a member of the World House of Fame. He was part of the Yugoslavia team which won the gold medal in water polo in the 1986 World Championships and 1988 Summer Olympics.

See also
 Yugoslavia men's Olympic water polo team records and statistics
 List of Olympic champions in men's water polo
 List of Olympic medalists in water polo (men)
 List of world champions in men's water polo
 List of World Aquatics Championships medalists in water polo

References

External links
 

1968 births
Living people
People from Kotor
Montenegrin male water polo players
Serbia and Montenegro male water polo players
Yugoslav male water polo players
Olympic water polo players of Yugoslavia
Olympic gold medalists for Yugoslavia
Water polo players at the 1988 Summer Olympics
Water polo players at the 1996 Summer Olympics
Water polo coaches
Olympic medalists in water polo
Medalists at the 1988 Summer Olympics
Croats of Montenegro